Line 5 of Wuhan Metro is a metro line in the city of Wuhan, Hubei.

The line started operation on 26 December 2021.

History

Stations

References

 
Railway lines opened in 2021